Teresa Muñoz (born 1974) is a Catalan writer. She was born in Barcelona, and obtained her bachelor's and master's degrees from the University of Barcelona. Since then, she has been closely involved with teaching and publishing in Catalan.

Her debut novel Com si fos ahir was published in 2014 to critical praise. She has published three books, all in Catalan: 
 Com si fos ahir 
 Des del balco
 Vint-i-set dinosaures

References

1974 births
Living people
Spanish women novelists
21st-century Spanish novelists
21st-century Spanish women writers
Catalan-language writers
Writers from Barcelona
University of Barcelona alumni